Zong! is a 2008 book-length poem by Canadian writer M. NourbeSe Philip. The work was first published in the U.S. by Wesleyan University Press and by The Mercury Press in Canada. Phillip has frequently staged full-length readings of the poem internationally as performance art. 

The poem focuses on victims of the Zong massacre, approximately 150 enslaved Africans who were murdered for insurance purposes in 1781. Reaction to the massacre and the lawsuits surrounding the case would propel the British abolitionist movement forward. The entire poem is compromised solely of words found in the 1783 case Gregson v Gilbert which determined that the massacre was legal.

Controversies
In 2016, Phillip was approached by award-winning Italian translator Renata Morresi about translating her work for Italian audiences. Phillip would later go on to denounce the Italian translation after it went forward without her knowledge or consent after her American publishers sold the rights.

Phillip has also accused Dutch playwright Rana Hamadeh of heavily using her research and poem in her opera The Ten Murders of Josephine. In a lengthy blog post she criticized Hamadeh for her use of the poem and its structure.

References

2008 poetry books